Maxwell Rotich (born 5 August 1998) is an Ugandan long-distance runner. 
In 2019, he competed in the senior men's race at the 2019 IAAF World Cross Country Championships held in Aarhus, Denmark. He finished in 27th place.

References

External links 
 

Living people
1998 births
Place of birth missing (living people)
Ugandan male long-distance runners
Ugandan male cross country runners
21st-century Ugandan people